Mountain View Adventist College is an independent Seventh-day Adventist co-educational primary and secondary day school, located in the western Sydney suburb of Doonside, New South Wales, Australia. It is a part of the Seventh-day Adventist education system, the world's second largest Christian school system.

History 
Mountain View Adventist College began in 1968 as a two-room primary school. It began to cater for Year 7-8 in 1983 and Year 10 by 1985. A Year 12 class was added in 1999. In 2004, the college began a pre-kindy class to cater for the needs of 4-year-olds.

Curriculum
The schools' curriculum consists primarily of the standard courses taught at college preparatory schools across the world. All students are required to take classes in the core areas of English, Basic Sciences, Mathematics, a Foreign Language, and Social Sciences.

Spiritual aspects
All students take religion classes each year that they are enrolled. These classes cover topics in biblical history and Christian and denominational doctrines. Instructors in other disciplines also begin each class period with prayer or a short devotional thought, many which encourage student input. Weekly, the entire student body gathers together for an hour-long chapel service. Outside the classrooms there is year-round spiritually oriented programming that relies on student involvement.

Sports
The College offers basketball, soccer, volleyball, rugby, netball, swimming, Austag, touch football, tennis, and table tennis.

See also 

 List of non-government schools in New South Wales
 Seventh-day Adventist education
 List of Seventh-day Adventist secondary schools

References 

1968 establishments in Australia
Adventist secondary schools in Australia
Educational institutions established in 1968
Private secondary schools in Sydney
Adventist primary schools in Australia
Private primary schools in Sydney